Epicutissimin A is a flavono-ellagitannin, a type of tannin.

References

Flavono-ellagitannins